The Commandant of Cadets is the officer in charge of the cadets at an academy.
Lists include:

 List of commandants of cadets of the United States Air Force Academy
 List of commandants of cadets of the United States Military Academy